The Greek Orthodox Archdiocese of Beirut is one of the nineteen archdioceses of the Greek Orthodox Church of Antioch. The establishment of the Archdiocese of Beirut is attributed by tradition to the Apostle Quartus, one of the Seventy Apostles. The area within the archdiocese has varied through the centuries as the Eastern Orthodox population changed. At different times the area of Mount Lebanon has been part of the Archdiocese of Beirut.

The diocese includes the area of the Lebanese capital, Beirut, and the town of Souk El Gharb and consists of eleven parishes and two women's monastic communities. The diocese is served by eighteen priests and four deacons.

In addition to its religious structure, the archdiocese supports a social structure that includes the 300-bed general hospital, St. George Hospital, that was founded in 1878, a nursing home for the elderly, and three dispensaries. These social and educational services are provided to the Lebanese population regardless of their religious, racial, or ethnic status.

The choir of Beirut led by Marcél Khourie provide for the daily offices and celebrations of the Mass at the church.

See also
 Eastern Orthodoxy in Lebanon

Sources
 Orthodox Archdiocese of Beirut (Official site)

References

Beirut
Churches in Beirut